Driftin' River is a 1946 American Western film directed by Robert Emmett Tansey and written by Frances Kavanaugh. The film stars Eddie Dean, Roscoe Ates, Shirley Patterson, Lee Bennett, William Fawcett, Dennis Moore, Lottie Harrison, Robert Callahan, Lee Roberts, Donald Murphy and Forrest Taylor. The film was released on October 1, 1946, by Producers Releasing Corporation.

Plot

Cast          
Eddie Dean as Eddie Dean
Roscoe Ates as Soapy Jones
Shirley Patterson as J. C. 'Jenny' Morgan
Lee Bennett as Tucson Brown
William Fawcett as Tennessee
Dennis Moore as Joe Marino
Lottie Harrison as Senora
Robert Callahan as Clem Kensington
Lee Roberts as Trigger
Donald Murphy as Captain Rogers 
Forrest Taylor as Major Hammond
Wylie Grant as Whistling Sam Wade 
Flash as Eddie's Horse

References

External links
 

1946 films
1940s English-language films
American Western (genre) films
1946 Western (genre) films
Producers Releasing Corporation films
Films directed by Robert Emmett Tansey
American black-and-white films
1940s American films